Uni Girona Club de Basquet, also known as Spar Girona (previously Spar Citylift Girona) for sponsorship reasons, is a Spanish women's basketball club from Girona.

History
Founded in 2005 from the fusion of local clubs CE Santa Eugènia and CB Vedruna, the team attained promotion for the Spanish First League in 2009, ending 5th in its first two seasons. In 2012 it qualified for the Copa de la Reina and the playoffs for the first time.

On April 23, 2015, Uni Girona won the Spanish League after defeating Perfumerías Avenida in the final series by 2–0.

Roster

Season by season

Trophies
 Liga Femenina de Baloncesto: (2)
2015, 2019
 Supercopa de España: (2)
Winners: 2015, 2019.
Runner-up: 2012.

Notable players

References

Liga Femenina de Baloncesto teams
Basketball teams established in 2005
Women's basketball teams in Spain
Catalan basketball teams
Sport in Girona